Dinesh Kashyap (born 18 November 1962) is an Indian politician and member of Bharatiya Janta Party. He was Member of Parliament from Bastar and also Member of Madhya Pradesh Legislative Assembly.

Personal life 
Shri Dinesh Kashyap brought up in a political family and learn the art of politics from childhood from his father. His father Shri Baliram Kashyap was a Member of Parliament from BJP from 1998 to 2011. He was one of the hardcore supporter of Shri Atal Bihari Vajpayee and Shri L K Advani. So, inspired from his father Shri Dinesh Kashyap pursued MA in political science from Pandit Ravishankar Shukla University, Raipur. His brother Kedar Nath Kashyap was a Cabinet Minister in Dr. Raman Singh Government.

He married Vedwati Kashyap in January 1991 and having 2 sons and 1 daughter.

Political life 

From his youth he was a leader for the youth wing of the Bastar Area. He was elected as General Secretary of Yuva Morcha, Bastar from 1985 to 1990. Kashyap first elected as Member of Madhya Pradesh Legislative Assembly. After this he has been active in the socio active life for ST people of Chhattisgarh. Now he is national secretary, BJP ST Moracha.

In 2011, he elected to the 15th Lok Sabha in a bye-election, during this phase he hold Member, Standing Committee on Social Justice and Empowerment in May 2014, re-elected to Lok Sabha for 2nd term. During this phase he hold positions like Member, Standing Committee on Food, Consumer Affairs and Public distribution & Member, Consultative Committee, Ministry of Steel and Mines, under Narendra Modi Government.

In news 
He leaded in the mainstream campaigns for the tribal development and agricultural facilities for the ST people. His active leadership also resulted many co-operative society developments in agricultural and horticultural sector as well as the rural health sector in the district of Bastar, Chhattisgarh.

Under his leadership, in February 2016, the double line to Kirundal to Vishakhapatanam route and on 20 November 2017, Baster (Jagdalpur) has been linked to North and West India by railway network and connected to Vishakhapatnam to connect with East and South India.

Positions held 
Source:

 1985–1990: General Secretary, Yuva Morcha, Bastar Chhattisgarh
 1990–1993: Member, Madhya Pradesh Legislative Assembly
 1995: Member, Zilla Panchayat, Bastar, Chhattisgarh
 1998–2004: District President, BJP ST Morcha, Chhattisgarh
 2004–2010: State President, BJP ST Morcha, Chhattisgarh
 2007–2008: Nominated President of District Central Co-operative Bank, District. Bastar
 2008–2013: Elected President of District Central Co-operative Bank, District. Bastar
 13 May 2011: Elected to the 15th Lok Sabha in a bye-election Member, Consultative Committee, Ministry of Panchayati Raj
 31 Aug. 2011 – 18 May 2014: Member, Standing Committee on Social Justice and Empowerment
 May 2014: Re-elected to 16th Lok Sabha (second term)
 1 Sep. 2014 onwards: Member, Committee on Absence of Members from the Sittings of the House, Member, Standing Committee on Food, Consumer Affairs and Public Distribution & Member, Consultative Committee, Ministry of Steel and Mines. National Secretary, BJP ST Morcha

References 
Official Bio Profile at Parliament of India Website

India MPs 2009–2014
India MPs 2014–2019
1962 births
Bharatiya Janata Party politicians from Chhattisgarh
Living people
Lok Sabha members from Chhattisgarh
Madhya Pradesh MLAs 1990–1992
People from Bastar district